The Men's 5,000m T54 had its First Round held on September 8 at 19:18 and its Final on September 11 at 19:35.

Medalists

Results

References

Round 1 - Heat 1
Round 1 - Heat 2
Round 1 - Heat 3
Final

Athletics at the 2008 Summer Paralympics